WWRI may refer to:

 WWRI (AM), a radio station (1450 AM) licensed to serve West Warwick, Rhode Island, United States
 WWRI-LP, a low-power radio station (95.1 FM) licensed to serve Coventry, Rhode Island